Rockin' Duck is the second studio album by English pop rock band GRIMMS, released in 1973. The album and was recorded at Island Studios, London, and combines pop music and poetry.

Track listing 

Side One

 "Rockin' Duck" (Innes)
 "Songs of the Stars" (Roberts)
 "The Right Mask" (Patten)
 "Policeman's Lot" (Gorman)
 "Question of Habit" (McGough)
 "Take It While You Can" (McGear, McGough)
 "Poetic Licence" (Patten, McGough)
 "The Masked Poet" (Gorman)

Side Two

 "Hiss and Boo" (Gorman)
 "Gruesome" (Roberts, McGough)
 "FX" (McGough)
 "Blab Blab Blab/EC" (Innes, McGough)
 "Backwards Thro' Space" (Patten, McGough)
 "The Prophet" (Patten)
 "OO-Chuck-A-Mao-Mao" (Innes)
 "End Of The Record" (McGough)

Personnel 
 Neil Innes – piano, electric piano, vocals
 Mike McGear – vocals
 Roger McGough – lyrics
 Brian Patten – lyrics
 John Gorman – vocals
 Andy Roberts – acoustic guitar, rhythm guitar, lead guitar, vocals
 David Richards – bass, vocals
 John Megginson – piano, organ, vocals
 Ollie Halsall – lead guitar, vocals
 Gerry Conway – drums
 Kate Robbins and Valerie Movie – backing vocals

1973 albums
Grimms albums
Island Records albums